Velkua is a former municipality of Finland. It was, together with Merimasku and Rymättylä, consolidated with the town of Naantali on January 1, 2009.

It is part of the Southwest Finland region. The municipality had a population of 245 (2005-12-31) and covered an area of 30.07 km² (excluding sea) of which 0.13 km² is inland water. The population density was 8,1 inhabitants per km².

The municipality was unilingually Finnish.

History 
The village of Palva, located on the homonymous island, was mentioned already in 1469. Its name may refer to a place where meat and fish were cured by hunters or to a site of worship. Palva was the original center of the area, becoming a separate chapel community in 1793, when it was a part of the Taivassalo parish. In the 19th century, the name Velkua began appearing for the chapel community after the largest island in it: Velkua or Velkuanmaa. A densely populated village on the island of Velkua, Velkuankaupunki, was established in the 19th century.

The municipality was established in the 1860s and Velkua had become the predominant name. Velkua became a separate parish in 1917.

Velkua was consolidated with Naantali in 2009.

References

External links

http://www.velkua.fi/ – Official website 

Former municipalities of Finland
Naantali
Finnish islands in the Baltic
Populated places disestablished in 2009
2009 disestablishments in Finland